"No Way Out" is the ninth episode and mid-season premiere of the sixth season of the post-apocalyptic horror television series The Walking Dead, which aired on AMC on February 14, 2016. The episode was written by Seth Hoffman and directed by Greg Nicotero.

Continuing from the previous cliffhanger, Rick Grimes (Andrew Lincoln), Carl Grimes (Chandler Riggs), Michonne (Danai Gurira) and the Anderson family move through the herd while Denise Cloyd (Merritt Wever) deals with being Alpha Wolf's hostage. Meanwhile, Daryl Dixon (Norman Reedus), Sasha Williams (Sonequa Martin-Green) and Abraham Ford (Michael Cudlitz) are forced to surrender their weapons to a threatening force of biker men, led by the unseen and enigmatic Negan. Most of the episode deals with the herd invasion in the Alexandria Safe-Zone. The episode adapts material from "Volume 14: No Way Out" from the comic book series of the same name. The injury of Carl Grimes and the deaths of the Andersons are major moments from the comic book adapted to screen.

This episode marks the final appearance of Alexandra Breckenridge as Jessie Anderson, as she is killed off along with her two sons, Ron (Austin Abrams) and Sam (Major Dodson). Their deaths were one of the many comic book moments adapted into this episode. The episode received critical acclaim and is generally considered to be one of the best of the series

While the episode serves as the mid-season premiere, it was the eighth filmed episode overall, succeeded by the Morgan Jones (Lennie James) flashback episode, "Here's Not Here", in production order.

Plot
Stopped on the road by a group of Saviors, Abraham, Sasha, and Daryl are forced to give up their weapons. They are told that their property now belongs to Negan. The group leader has one of the henchmen take Daryl to the back of the fuel truck to begin a thorough search, while continuing his attempts to intimidate Abraham and Sasha into revealing the location of Alexandria. He suggests he is going to kill Abraham when Daryl, who has silently strangled the henchman to death, blows up the entire group with Abraham's RPG launcher.

Rick, Carl, Gabriel, Michonne, Judith, Jessie, Ron, and Sam escape Jessie's house in makeshift walker-gut ponchos to camouflage themselves from the walkers, holding hands to stay together. Rick decides to lead them to the quarry to retrieve vehicles and repeat his earlier plan to lure the herd away from Alexandria, while Gabriel takes Judith to the safety of his church. Jessie tries to get Sam to go with Gabriel, but he refuses. As they head toward the front gate, Sam has a breakdown when he notices a walker-child, and his cries attract the walkers, who devour him alive. Jessie refuses to let go of Sam's hand, and is also feasted upon. Carl is unable to free himself from Jessie's grip, so Rick chops off Jessie's arm with a hatchet, freeing Carl, who stumbles and drops his gun. With his entire family now dead, Ron picks up Carl's gun and aims it at Rick, but Michonne impales him with her katana. The gun fires, however, shooting out Carl's right eye.

Meanwhile, the Wolf hides with Denise, waiting for an opportunity to slip through the walkers and escape. When there is a clear route over the wall they make their move, but the Wolf goes back to save a faltering Denise and is bitten in the process. Denise makes a deal to save his life if he gets her to the infirmary. While Denise puts a tourniquet around his arm, the Wolf questions why he endangered himself to save her and the psychiatrist suggests that he's changed and become more like the Alexandrians.

Carol searches Morgan's home for "other surprises" and he apologizes for hurting her; Carol, not convinced, responds that she should have killed Morgan. Carol looks out the window and shoots the Wolf as he passes, and shouts for Denise to run and is shocked when the Wolf, even as he is swarmed and eaten by walkers, echoes Carol's calls for Denise to go and save herself. The Wolf later re-animates as a walker and is put down by Morgan, who apologizes as he kills it.

Denise manages to get to the infirmary where she begins helping Carl. Realizing there's nothing left for him to do at the infirmary, Rick goes outside and begins an onslaught against the walkers. As soon as Carl is stitched up, Michonne, Heath, Aaron, and Spencer rush outside to join Rick. Their actions motivate others of Rick's group and many Alexandrians to join the battle, with Eugene recognizing that this will be a moment in history where everyone would be counted, and Gabriel preaching that God has saved them by making them brave enough to fight. Glenn creates a diversion so Enid can get to Maggie on the shaky lookout tower, but is swarmed and saved by the timely arrival of Daryl, Abraham, and Sasha, the latter two shooting assault rifles from atop the fuel truck.

Glenn opens the gate so Maggie and Enid can climb down the fuel truck, and they with Sasha and Abraham cover Daryl who fills a pond with fuel and ignites it with the RPG launcher. The enormous pool of fire in the night immediately draws the attention of the walkers. This takes pressure off of those fighting just as they were about to be overwhelmed, allowing them to gain the upper hand and continue relentlessly. The next morning, the survivors regroup after having killed every last walker. Rick pleads with his unconscious son to pull through, hopeful for the future as the Alexandrians have proven they have what it takes to live, now believing that Deanna's plans could be achieved. Carl's fingers close around Rick's hand in seeming response.

Reception

Critical reception
The episode received critical acclaim and is generally considered to be one of the best of the series. On Rotten Tomatoes, it holds a 97% with an average rating of 8.28 out of 10, based on 34 reviews. The critics' consensus reads: "No Way Out" is a brutally entertaining rebound from a lackluster first half of the season, re-energized with arresting, jaw-dropping developments.

Ratings
The episode averaged a 6.8 rating in adults 18-49, with 13.742 million viewers overall. This is both a decrease from the Season 6 mid-season finale, which averaged a 7.0 rating and 13.981 million viewers overall, as well as a decrease from the Season 5 mid-season premiere, which received an 8.0 in adults 18-49, with 15.64 million viewers overall.

Including Live+3 viewing, the episode was watched by 19.07 million viewers.

Accolades

References

External links

"No Way Out" at AMC

2016 American television episodes
The Walking Dead (season 6) episodes